The 2002 Wisconsin Badgers football team represented the University of Wisconsin in the 2002 NCAA Division I-A football season.

Schedule

Rankings

Season summary
Coming off a disappointing 5–7 2001 season, the Badgers of 2002 wanted improvement. Despite amazing statistics from WR Lee Evans and RB Anthony Davis, the Badgers had issues closing out games, and an overworked defense managed lackluster efforts when the team could hardly afford  them.

In the spring game, Wisconsin's offense suffered a devastating blow when top receiver Lee Evans was lost for the season with a torn ACL. Evan's loss was a significant blow, but despite it, Wisconsin managed to start off the season by winning all five of their nonconference games. From there, though, things did not go Wisconsin's way; the Badgers lost their first three Big Ten games by less than 7 points. Among those was a near-upset of eventual National Champion Ohio State, a 19–14 Ohio State win that was Jim Tressel's first over the Badgers (having lost 20–17 to Wisconsin the previous year). After going 0–3 to open their Big Ten slate, Wisconsin defeated Michigan State in Spartan Stadium 42–24 for their first conference win of the season. After that game, Wisconsin would lose their next 3 games against Big Ten opponents, including a 20–3 loss to Big Ten co-champion Iowa, and yet another close game against a Lloyd Carr-coached Michigan team. The loss to Michigan dropped Wisconsin to 1–6 in Big Ten play.

To close out the regular season, Wisconsin finally put together a complete game in a 49–31 blowout of rival Minnesota, taking back Paul Bunyan's Axe and keeping Minnesota's losing streak in Camp Randall alive. The Badgers improved to 7–6 on the season.

Wisconsin was awarded a berth in the Alamo Bowl, having gotten the required 6 wins in the regular season, and faced Colorado, a Big Twelve opponent that had won the Big Twelve North outright and lost the Big Twelve Championship Game 29–7 to Oklahoma. At 9-4, Colorado entered the game ranked 14th in the nation, and hoping for a ten-win season. But Wisconsin managed to keep up with Colorado, and won the game 31–28 in overtime for their 8th win of the season, knocking Colorado to 9–5 on the year.

For Wisconsin, Freshman WR Jonathan Orr put together a good season in the absence of Lee Evans, catching 47 passes for 842 yards, with 8 receiving touchdowns. RB Anthony Davis ran for 1,555 yards on 300 carries, with 13 touchdowns. QB Brooks Bollinger, in his senior season, completed 131 passes on 245 attempts for 1,758 yards and 14 touchdowns, with just 4 interceptions.

Roster

Game summaries

Fresno State

UNLV

West Virginia

Northern Illinois

Arizona

#20 Penn State

Indiana

#4 Ohio State

Michigan State

#9 Iowa

Illinois

#12 Michigan

Minnesota

#14 Colorado

Regular starters

Team players selected in the 2003 NFL Draft

References

Wisconsin
Wisconsin Badgers football seasons
Alamo Bowl champion seasons
Wisconsin Badgers football